The 1922 Inverness by-election was a by-election held on 16 March 1922 for the British House of Commons constituency of Inverness.

Vacancy
The by-election was caused by the resignation of the sitting Coalition Liberal Member of Parliament (MP) Rt Hon. Sir Thomas Brash Morison, upon his appointment as a Senator of the College of Justice. Morison had held the seat since 1917.

Electoral history
At the last general election, the Liberal candidate, Sir Thomas Morison was elected with the endorsement of the Coalition Government.

Candidates
The Inverness Liberal Association chose as their candidate to defend the seat, Sir Murdoch Macdonald. Macdonald was a supporter of the Coalition Government and received the additional support of the Inverness Unionist Association. The Scottish Liberal Federation, who were opposed to the Coalition Government, organised support for Mackenzie Livingstone, who was adopted as an Independent Liberal candidate.

Result
The result was a victory for the Coalition Liberal candidate.

Aftermath

Sir Murdoch Macdonald held the seat until he retired in 1950 aged 83.

References

By-elections to the Parliament of the United Kingdom in Scottish constituencies
1922 in Scotland
1920s elections in Scotland
1922 elections in the United Kingdom
History of Inverness
Politics of the county of Inverness
20th century in Inverness